The Rocky Flats Truth Force was a grass-roots non-violent anti-nuclear group formed during protests at the Rocky Flats Nuclear Weapons Plant near Golden, Colorado during the late 1970s. Demonstrations and track blockages at the Rocky Flats Plant in 1978 resulted in multiple arrests of the protesters. The Rocky Flats Plant was a US nuclear weapon complex located near to 
Denver Colorado which operated from 1952 until 1992, creating considerable  radioactive contamination.

Some of the people involved in the Truth Force movement formed the Boulder Peace Center, later the Rocky Mountain Peace Center and then the current name - the Rocky Mountain Peace and Justice Center.

References

External links 
 Rocky Flats Truth Force Facebook group
 Boulder Public Library Oral History Program recordings relating to the Rocky Flats Truth Force
 Google Books search for Rocky Flats Truth Force
 OCLC WorldCat library search
 "Radical's Reunion: Rocky Flats Truth Force 1988" video featuring Allen Ginsberg, Anne Waldman, Daniel Ellsberg.

Anti–nuclear weapons movement
Anti-nuclear organizations based in the United States
Truth Force